Jacques Perret (September 8, 1901, Trappes, Yvelines – December 10, 1992, Paris) was a French writer best known for his novel Le Caporal Épinglé (1947), which tells the story of his captivity in Germany and of his escape attempts. This novel would later be adapted into a film by famous French director Jean Renoir in 1962. Perret was nominated for the Academy Award for Best Story for the film The Sheep Has Five Legs (1954).

Works

Chronicles
 1953 Bâtons dans les roues, Gallimard 
 1954 Cheveux sur la soupe, Gallimard 
 1957 Salades de saison, Gallimard 
 1964 Le vilain temps, Le Fuseau
 1980 Un marché aux puces, Julliard

Novels
 1936 Roucou,Gallimard
 1937 Ernest le rebelle, Gallimard
 1947 Le caporal épinglé, Gallimard
 1948 Le vent dans les voiles,Gallimard
 1951 Bande à part, Gallimard
 1953 Mutinerie à bord, Amiot-Dumont
 1961 Les biffins de Gonesse, Gallimard
 1969 La compagnie des eaux, Gallimard

Short stories
 1947 l’Oiseau rare, Gallimard
 1949 Objets perdus,Gallimard
 1951 la Bête Mahousse,Gallimard
 1953 Histoires sous le vent, Gallimard
 1955 Le machin, Gallimard
 1981 Tirelires,Julliard

Memories
 1975 Grands chevaux et dadas, Gallimard 
 1976 Raisons de famille, Gallimard
 1980 Un marché aux puces, Julliard 
 1982 Belle lurette, Julliard
 1985 Le jardin des Plantes, Julliard

Various
 1964 Preface to Rabelais's Pantagruel, Gallimard
 1965 Rapport sur le paquet de gris, Aspects de la France
 1979 Preface to Alexandre Vialatte's C'est ainsi qu'Allah est grand, Julliard
 1964 Trois pièces (Maximilien, Monsieur Georges, Caracalla), Editions Gallimard (plays)
 1989 Les collectionneurs, Le Dilettante
 1991 Articles de sport, Julliard
 1992 Comme Baptiste...ou les tranquillisants à travers les âges, Le Dilettante
 1996 François, Alfred, Gustave et les autres, Le Dilettante 
 2004 L'aventure en bretelles, followed by Un Blanc chez les Rouges, Le Dilettante
 2005 Chroniques, Arcadia Editions

External links
 

People from Trappes
1901 births
1992 deaths
French monarchists
20th-century French non-fiction writers
French prisoners of war in World War II
French military personnel of World War II
French Resistance members
Prix Interallié winners
20th-century French male writers